The sixth-generation Ford Mustang (S550) is the current iteration of the Mustang pony car manufactured by Ford.  In departure from prior Mustang models, the sixth-generation Mustang includes fully independent rear suspension on all models, as well as an optional 2.3L EcoBoost turbocharged and direct injected four-cylinder engine. The new Mustang was introduced as a 2015 model year vehicle, marking the fiftieth anniversary of the Ford Mustang, which was revealed as a 1965 model year vehicle on April 17, 1964.

The sixth generation is also the first Ford Mustang to be marketed and sold globally, and represented the first time that factory right-hand-drive Mustangs were produced in addition to the left-hand-drive models. This is part of the "One Ford" business plan, which also applies to the Fiesta, Focus, Fusion/Mondeo, Escape/Kuga, Edge, Ford Transit Connect, and Ford Transit, as well as other models.

Background
The sixth generation of the Ford Mustang debuted on December 5, 2013, with same-day media events in Dearborn, Michigan, Los Angeles, California, New York City, New York, Barcelona, Spain, Shanghai, China, and Sydney, Australia. The 2015 Mustang marks the 50th anniversary of continuous Mustang production, which began in March 1964 in advance of the debut of the original Mustang at the 1964 New York World's Fair on April 17, 1964, in Flushing, Queens.

Development of the 2015 Mustang, codenamed "S550", began in 2009 under chief engineer Dave Pericak and (from late-2009) exterior design director Joel Piaskowski, shortly after the updated 2010 model year Mustang went on sale. In December 2010, an exterior design theme proposal by Kemal Curic from Ford's Cologne, Germany design studios was selected by design management. Curic (also responsible for the 2011 Focus (2012 in the US) and the 2014 Mondeo/Fusion) relocated to Ford's design studios in Dearborn in January 2011. During mid-stage development, Curic's original exterior design proposal was eventually rejected by Ford executives, resulting in rapid design changes. After reviewing 3 different exterior theme proposals (A, B, and C) in design clinics in September 2012, the final exterior design (Theme A) was approved by Ford management, with the final design freeze occurring in December 2012, 20 months ahead of originally scheduled August 2014 production. The interior design program began in the spring of 2010, under Doyle Letson. By late 2011, a final interior proposal was settled on and was a combination of Themes A & B. In June 2012, the final interior design was frozen. The decision to utilize an independent rear suspension for this generation (which had been standard on the 99-04 SVT Cobra) was made very early on (the original intent had been to append an IRS to the existing S197 platform, which ironically enough had been tested with an IRS during its development), and its inclusion resulted in several changes to the platform, not least of which being the redesign of the front suspension (the new platform features a double-pivot MacPherson strut front suspension, similar to a design used on many BMWs); the result, according to Chief Engineer Dave Pericak, was a brand new platform that had very little in common with its predecessor, from a structural perspective, other than the wheelbase, which carried over. The first test mules in 2010 model year bodies were spotted earlier in June 2012, and the first S550 prototypes were built five months later (exterior design freeze) in May 2013.

Engines
At launch, three engines were available: a 3.7 L V6 (codenamed "Cyclone"), a 2.3 L turbocharged I4 (EcoBoost) or a 5.0 L modular V8 ("Coyote").

The Shelby GT350 used a modified variant of the modular V8 engine, codenamed the "Voodoo", that featured a displacement of 5,163cc (315 cubic inches) with a flat-plane crankshaft.

The 2.3 L EcoBoost engine debuted in the 2015 Lincoln MKC crossover, which includes improvements over previous iterations. This also reintroduced the 4-cylinder engine to the Mustang lineup, which were standard in cars produced from 1974 to 1993, as well as in the "SVO" turbocharged models from 1984 to 1986.

In 2017, Ford discontinued the V6, leaving the 2.3 L turbocharged I4, 5.0 L V8 and 5.2 L V8 as the remaining engine options.

In 2018, the 5.0 L V8 engine was updated (2018 (Gen. 3) Updates) with revised intake runners, larger valves and dual injection, which utilizes both direct injection and port injection, enabling it to run 87 octane (AKI) gasoline with 12:1 high compression ratio. The cylinders are lined with a plasma coating, instead of traditional cylinder sleeves.

The Shelby GT500 utilizes another variant of the modular V8 engine, code-named the "Predator". The engine uses a cross-plane crankshaft and includes a 2.7 L twin-scroll supercharger. At the time of their release, both the GT350 and GT500 were the first to use engines with forged aluminum pistons.

 export-spec models are available in EcoBoost, GT and Bullitt specifications, with their engines modified for right-hand drive configurations and emission standards.

In 2020, Ford introduced the "High Performance Package" for the EcoBoost model. The package includes the high-output 2.3 L I4 engine from the Ford Focus RS mounted in a longitudinal configuration.

In 2021, the Shelby GT350 and Bullitt models were discontinued in favor of the Mach 1.

For the 2022 model year, the GT and Mach 1 variants received engine modifications that reduced output by 10 hp and 10 lb-ft to meet the Low-Emission Vehicle (LEV III) program requirements provided by the California Air Resources Board.

Transmission

The following table shows the transmission gear ratios for six-speed manual transmission on the 3.7-liter V6, 2.3-liter EcoBoost and 5.0-liter V8

The following table shows the transmission gear ratios for a six-speed automatic transmission on the 3.7-liter V6, 2.3-liter EcoBoost I4 and 5.0-liter V8

UK and AU/NZ-bound right-hand drive models are available in both automatic and manual transmissions, but as of June 2016, Asia-bound right-hand drive models are only offered with the six-speed automatic which, along with the EcoBoost or GT Performance packages (standard on base specs), comes bundled with the 3.55:1 limited-slip final drive ratio.  Nevertheless, a limited number of such manual transmission models, particularly on the GT, may be offered towards the end of the year.

Body

Bodywork
The sixth generation of Mustang has been influenced on the front end by Ford's Evos concept which was featured in the Frankfurt Auto Show in 2011. The famous “tri-bar” style taillights are used, and illuminate sequentially as turn signals (for North American models). The Mustang also incorporates "signature lighting" in the form of three illuminated "light bars" located on the inner portion of each headlight, reminiscent of the front-end fascia found on the First-generation Mustang.

The export-spec models illuminate only the outer portions of the taillight bars when turn signals are used, and reflectors are used in place of the "signature lighting" within the headlights. The export-spec also includes a "fuel cap-style" emblem on the deck-lid.

Interior

The Mustang's interior body style resembles that of an airplane cockpit along with an increased body width, and a larger cabin similar to the Ford GT. This design gives more room in the back of the vehicle for rear passengers.

A metal tag on the dashboard bears the Ford Mustang "Running Horse" insignia and logo.

Technology
Standard features for all 2015+ Ford Mustangs include: proximity key entry with door-mounted touch sensors and keyless entry, push-button start system, an AM/FM stereo with single-disc CD/MP3 player, color LCD display, the Ford SYNC System with Bluetooth hands-free phone and A2DP wireless stereo audio streaming, USB/iPod and 3.5-millimeter auxiliary audio input jacks, a cluster-mounted central color LCD driver's information display screen, electronic traction control system (ETCS), electronic stability control system (ESCS), antilock braking system (ABS), front and side-mounted SRS airbags, automatic 9-1-1 call for airbag deployment, and a rear backup camera system.

Optional features include Sirius XM Satellite Radio, the MyFord Touch (2015) or SYNC 3 (2016+) touch-screen multimedia infotainment system with an 8-inch color touch-screen LCD display, smartphone integration, app integration, support for Apple CarPlay and Android Auto (introduced in 2017), Sirius XM Travel Link, HD Radio, and a microSD card slot, plus enhanced voice control. GPS navigation is available, as is a nine-speaker premium sound system, or a twelve-speaker Shaker Pro surround-sound system.

Options

For 2015, the Coupe style is renamed the Fastback to pay tribute to the previous-generation Mustang models. The Convertible remains the same. The 2015 Ford Mustang is offered in several models:

 The V6 model offers standard features such as the 3.7 L V6 engine carried over from the previous-generation Mustang, cloth front bucket seats, an AM/FM radio with six speakers, Ford SYNC, USB, iPod, and auxiliary input jacks, seventeen-inch alloy wheels, keyless access with push-button start and either a six-speed manual transmission or automatic transmission. The model is available in Fastback or Convertible styles.
 The EcoBoost model offers the same features as the V6 model, but replaces the V6 engine with the 2.3 L Turbocharged I4 engine and adds power front driver's and passenger's seats. This model is only available in Fastback style.
 The EcoBoost Premium model adds to the EcoBoost model leather seating surfaces, MyFord Touch with Ford SYNC, and HD Radio, the SHAKER Premium Sound System,  and more. This model is available in Fastback or Convertible styles.
 The GT model includes the 5.0 L V8 engine. This model is only available in Fastback style.
 The GT Premium model adds to the GT model leather seating surfaces, MyFord Touch with Ford SYNC, and HD Radio, the SHAKER Premium Sound System,  and more. This model is available in Fastback or Convertible styles.
The Shelby GT500 model from the Fifth-generation was discontinued for 2015, along with the 5.8 L supercharged modular V8 engine.  They have since been supplanted by the GT350/350R models featuring the 5.2 L flat-plane crank V8.

Export-spec variants currently consist of only the EcoBoost and GT grades, with the UK and Australia receiving both the Fastback and Convertible styles and various parts of Asia (Hong Kong, Singapore, Malaysia, Taiwan) receiving the Fastback only (as of June 2016).  Meanwhile, Performance Packages are standard on all Asia-bound EcoBoost and GT trims. Markets like India receive only the GT trim (mated to the automatic transmission).

An EcoBoost Performance Package was added for the 2020 model year, which includes the aforementioned EcoBoost engine from the Focus RS, along with upgraded various parts. A handling package was also available, which added active dampers (MagneRide) and wider tires.

Models

Shelby GT350 (2015–2020)

The GT350 is more track focused than the GT500, and was benchmarked against the Camaro Z28, Porsche GT3, Mercedes-Benz C63, and BMW M4. Notable features are track-focused chassis tuning, significant aero-dynamic changes to include lowering the hood around the engine, 2-piece, cross-drilled brake rotors paired with Brembo calipers, MagneRide damping option, lightweight Tremec TR-3160 six speed manual transmission, Recaro seats, and various lightweight components (e.g., carbon fiber reinforced polymer radiator support that directs cooling channels for various components).

Additional options, such as larger alloy wheels, navigation system, rear backup sensors, a rear backup camera, blind spot monitoring, security system, SHAKER PRO Surround Sound Premium Sound System, premium leather seating surfaces, and HID front headlamps are available. Interior color is limited to the standard Black interior color scheme.

The GT350 and GT350R have been discontinued for the 2021 model year in favor of the GT500, with Ford offering the Mach 1 as an indirect successor.

Bullitt (2019–2020) 

To celebrate the 50th anniversary of the film Bullitt, Ford unveiled the latest incarnation of the Bullitt edition Mustang GT at the 2018 North American International Auto Show (NAIAS). The unveiling was presented by Molly McQueen, granddaughter of Steve McQueen. Like the original 1968 car, this Mustang will be offered in Dark Highland Green, but also in Black. In addition, the car will have custom instrument panel graphics, dashboard stitching, seat pattern, and optional Recaro seats. A six-speed manual is the only transmission available on this model.
Steeda created a "Steve McQueen Limited Edition" of the Bullitt in partnership with Chad McQueen and McQueen Racing, which was a globally limited edition to 300 units worldwide.

Shelby GT500 (2020–2023) 
In addition to the Bullitt edition Mustang GT, the Shelby GT500 moniker returned in 2019 as a 2020 model, after a six-year hiatus. The new GT500 has a supercharged motor based on the GT350's 5.2 L V8 block, but with a cross-plane crankshaft as opposed to a flat-plane crankshaft (as in GT350), which generates .

Mach 1 (2021–2023) 
The Mach 1 returned as a 2021 model, marking the first time the nameplate has been used since 2004. 
The lightweight TREMEC six-speed manual transmission, intake manifold, oil-filter adapter, engine oil cooler, and front and rear sub-frame are shared with the Shelby GT350, while the rear axle cooling system, rear toe link, and rear diffuser are shared with the Shelby GT500.

Special editions

Mustang 50 Year Limited Edition (2015)

A total of 1,964 units of a version of the 2015 Ford Mustang GT Coupé with the performance pack and either a manual or automatic transmission, were made to commemorate the 50th anniversary of the Ford Mustang vehicle lineup. Changes included a choice of two special edition body colors based on 1964 model year colors (Wimbledon White and Kona Blue), louvered rear quarter- windows with layered sheets of glass, cashmere-stitched leather-wrapped steering wheel, cashmere-stitching in instrument panel, shifter boot, center armrest, door inserts and seats; exclusive two-tone cashmere and black leather upholstery, Mustang 50 Year logo on the seat backs, loop-carpet floor mats with cashmere stitching and suede binding, 19-inch (9.0/9.5-inch front/rear) alloy wheels with unique Y-spoke design, 255/40R front tires, 275/40R rear tires.

The vehicle was unveiled at the 2014 New York International Auto Show and the vehicle went on sale in September 2014.

This model will be marketed as a 2014 1/2 model, paying tribute to the original 1964 1/2 model. Wimbledon White and Kona Blue will no longer be available exterior colors on the Mustang after the 50 Year Limited Edition's discontinuation when the model sells out.

A "one of one" convertible version of the 50 Year Limited Edition Mustang was raffled off for charity on the "Woodward Dream Cruise" on August 16, 2014, with the proceeds benefitting the National Multiple Sclerosis Society.

The 50 Years Appearance Package will continue to be available on the EcoBoost Premium and GT Premium Fastback and Convertible models after the 50 Year Limited Edition sells out. It will add nineteen-inch chrome-finished alloy wheels, the "stable"-style front grille, the "Running Horse" front fender badges, a unique "Raven" interior color scheme, and more.

A 50-Year Limited Edition 2015 Ford Mustang served as the pace car for the NASCAR Sprint Cup and Nationwide Series races during Ford Championship Weekend at Homestead-Miami Speedway, November 14–16, 2014.

F-35 Lightning II (2015)

On July 31, 2014, a special 2015 Mustang was auctioned off at the Experimental Aircraft Association (EAA) AirVenture air show in Oshkosh, Wisconsin, with proceeds going to benefit the EAA's Young Eagles program.

The F-35 Lightning II Mustang was named after the then new F-35 Lightning II fighter jet. Based on a 2015 Mustang GT fastback, this one-off model was one of the first sixth generation Mustangs to be sold. The exterior features glossy and matte dark-silver paint along with yellow hood stripes, mirror caps, and brake calipers. Blue and yellow rear-end graphics mimic the tail livery of early-production examples of the F35 fighter jet, as does the gold tint on its windows. The car sits on lowered Eibach springs and custom black and yellow Forgiato 21-inch wheels, while the exhaust system is modified with larger, ceramic-coated cans. The F-35 Lightning II Mustang also features a custom aero kit with carbon-fiber components including a front splitter, sill extensions, a rear diffuser, and a stand-up rear spoiler. The final exterior touches come in the form of an F-35 badge on the rear panel, and the flags of nine U.S. allies on the lower doors. The interior of the car features mix of black and yellow parts, with additions including Recaro racing seats, a modified instrument cluster, custom audio system, and sill plates, as well as F-35 Lightning II embroidery on the floor mats, door panels, and seatbacks. The car comes with a 6-speed manual transmission.

Galpin Fisker Rocket (2015)

Unveiled at the 2014 Los Angeles Auto Show, the Rocket is a variety of the Mustang modified by Henrik Fisker, a Danish automobile designer.

Roush RS Models (2015–2017) 
The Roush RS models are upgrade packages from Roush Performance for the Mustang. For 2015, the standard components of each RS model include new front and rear fascias, new grill, driving lamps, side-sill extensions, a rear spoiler, embroidered floor mats. Stage 1 vehicles also have a performance exhaust system, while Stage 2 cars get all of the above plus a set of five-spoke 20-inch “Quicksilver” wheels and Cooper RS3 performance tires. (The rolling stock is available as an upgrade on the other two models.) Optional on all are a hood scoop, window scoops, billet pedals, a ball shifter, Roush gauges and door sill plates. Stage 1 and Stage 2 models can also be upgraded with a reverse-sensing system and active exhaust.

For 2016, the basic RS model carries over unchanged. The Stage 1 setup now supports the 4 cylinder EcoBoost. Stage 2 also carries over. Completely new for 2016 is the Roush Stage 3. The  version still keeps the Ford and Roush 3 year / 36,000 mile warranty, but the  version does not. Standard features include a Roush Quad-Tip exhaust (with the ROUSH Active Exhaust System as an optional add-on), and the “R7” aerobody, complete with graphics and badging. The RS3 comes equipped with a standard single adjustable coilover suspension system, with an optional competition-tuned 3-way adjustable system available.

Saleen S302 Models (2015–2016)

Saleen has introduced 3 different models for the sixth-generation Mustang.

The "White Label S302" includes a naturally aspirated 450 hp 302ci 5.0 L V8 engine. A manual transmission is standard but an automatic is optional. This model contains the Saleen S302 styling package for advanced aerodynamics. The White Label is available in 23 different colors, with 2 different wheel size options: standard 20" 5 spoke, or an optional 19" 7 spoke. Both wheels are available in standard Silver/Chrome, Carbonite, or Brushed Aluminum finish. To make this model Saleen specific, there is a Saleen logo deck lid insert and model specific badging. Other upgrades include a spoiler known as the "Saleen high downforce wing" and a Saleen exhaust system. The White Label can be configured in either a coupe or convertible version. Each vehicle is given its own VIN and is catalogued throughout the manufacturing process, giving it authentic collectability and higher resale values.

For the "Yellow Label S302" model, all of the amenities listed above are included, but with an eight generation Saleen Supercharger good for 715 hp under the hood.

The "Black Label S302" comes standard with a 450 hp 302ci 5.0 L V8 engine, but can be optioned with a supercharger and Powerflash calibration to make . Wheel and color options are the same as the White and Yellow labels. The Saleen exhaust system also carries over from the White and Yellow labels. Other performance modifications include a standard S4 suspension package or an optional fully adjustable suspension setup and 13.9" vented 4-piston brakes which come standard, or 15" slotted 6-piston brakes, which are optional. The Black Label also features a body kit, including a completely redesigned front fascia, axial grill, hood, side skirts, wing, and rear diffuser.

Shelby American GT (2015–2016)

There is an optional hood extension, mirror cap, tail light panel, and convertible light bar available. When ordering the car, you have the option of all the factory paint colors, plus the option of racing stripes in 5 different colors. Other visual hues include special Shelby badging and 20" WELD Racing Wheels available in 3 different colors and upper and lower grilles with Shelby GT badging in 2 different colors. The interior of the car gets a Shelby GT dash plaque as well as embroidered headrests and floor mats. A Katzkin interior is also available as an option as well as Shelby valve covers, and an engine cap kit.

Performance wise, the Shelby GT is outfitted with a cold air intake that comes standard with the car good for a small increase in horsepower. Also standard is the Ford Performance handling pack, short throw shifter, and exhaust with Shelby tips.

The car can be customized in coupe or convertible forms, as well as in GT or Ecoboost versions.

Warrior Edition (2015–2016)

In 2015, Roush Motorsport teamed up with Military Auto Sales to build vehicles specifically for military members stationed overseas, or currently deployed. The result was a numbered and limited run of 15 stage 3, GT-based  supercharged fastbacks, and 30 Ecoboost-based  fastbacks. They were only available in Race Red or Midnight Black, with the opposite color on their side stripes and decals. Most came with a 6-speed manual transmission.

For 2016, a second run of 45 were offered for sale. They were split evenly between Shadow Black, Race Red, and Deep Impact Blue.

Shelby GT350R (2015–2020) 
A further enhanced and even more limited edition of the GT350 with an "R" package (GT350R) was introduced by Ford in 2015, with only 37 units being made. The first GT350R with #001 sold for $1 million at a Barrett Jackson Auction in Scottsdale, Arizona.

Significant engineering innovations result in weight savings, aero improvements to benefit on-track performance; Ford is the first major automaker to introduce carbon fiber wheels as standard equipment on Shelby GT350R Mustang. Items removed include air conditioning, the stereo system, rear seats, trunk floorboard and carpet, backup camera and emergency tire sealer and inflator. Exhaust resonators also have been removed for weight savings with the benefit of creating a sharper exhaust tone.

The Shelby GT350R is more than  lighter than the Shelby GT350 Track Pack model, which has proven its durability in multiple 24-hour racetrack tests. The GT350R also comes with carbon fiber wheels, supplied by Australian manufacturer Carbon Revolution, which weigh only  each compared to similarly specified aluminum wheels which typically weigh  each.

Aside from carbon fiber wheels, larger front splitter and rear wing, Shelby GT350R features distinct design details. Exterior touches include red painted brake calipers, red pin striping at the edges of the optional over-the-top racing stripes and Shelby GT350R badging. Inside is high-contrast red stitching, Shelby GT350R badging and the D-shaped steering wheel fitted with a red center mark at the top.

One optional feature for the GT350R is the GT350R Technology Package, which adds the Ford SYNC 3 multimedia infotainment system, seven speakers, a rear backup camera system, SIRIUS-XM Satellite Radio, and air conditioning. The package is ideal for GT350R buyers who plan to use their car for more than track purposes or for show.  Parts of this package, namely the infotainment system and backup camera, were made standard during April 2018 production, due to U.S. legislation requiring all new vehicles sold in the U.S. to have backup cameras.

Shelby GT500 Signature Edition (2021) 
The special edition of the standard GT500 only sold by Shelby. It includes 800+ hp, lowered and tuned suspension and  shed. Shelby limits production to 100 cars per model year.

Shelby GT500 Code Red (2022) 
The first experimental car from Shelby which found its way to production. The car has a high-performance 5.2L V8 boosted by a twin-turbo system, which contributes to a final output of over 1000 HP with 93-octane fuel and up to 1300 HP while running on ethanol. Shelby will produce 10 cars per model year.

Concepts and prototypes

Mustang Cobra Jet 1400 
Unveiled by Ford Performance, the Mustang Cobra Jet 1400 is an electric dragster prototype. The V8 engine was replaced with high-output electric motors. The electric prototype is a homage to the first Cobra Jet that was heavily tested on drag strips. Mark Rushbrook, the CEO of Ford Performance Motorsports, says that the Cobra Jet 1400 is an opportunity to develop electric powertrains on an existing, popular sports car. The developers for the Mustang Cobra Jet 1400 include MLe Racecars, Watson Engineering, AEM EV, and Cascadia.

2018 refresh

On January 17, 2017, Ford officially introduced the refreshed 2018 Mustang. For 2018, Ford discontinued the V6 model and its  3.7L Cyclone V6 engine, leaving the EcoBoost, GT, Shelby GT350, and Shelby GT350R. The refreshed Mustang sports a restyled front clip and dashboard design, and new standard and optional wheels. Additionally, Ford introduced a 12-inch LCD digital gauge cluster as an option for premium models.  However, none of these updates were applied to the Shelby GT350/GT350R, which retained their unique front end and instrument cluster.

A new ten-speed automatic transmission (10R80) replaces the existing six-speed unit (6R80), and joins the six-speed manual transmission as an option. The new automatic transmission was developed by a  joint venture between General Motors and the Ford Motor Company, where it is already used in the 2017 Chevrolet Camaro ZL1 and 2017 Ford F-150 SVT Raptor. The MagneRide adjustable suspension system, previously only available in the Shelby GT350 and the Shelby GT350R, is now available on standard Mustang models. An Active Valve Performance exhaust system allows the driver to adjust the volume of the Mustang's exhaust. Also, a heated leather-wrapped steering wheel is now offered in addition to the available heated and ventilated front seats. The instrument panel has also been redesigned with new trim panels, available in four standard finishes, as well as carbon fiber, depending upon the model of Mustang that is chosen.  The Performance Package Level 2 option incorporates a larger radiator, wider Michelin Pilot Sport Cup 2 tires and Brembo brake calipers (like on the GT350), enhanced springs, K-Brace, a Strut-Tower Brace, larger Sway Bar, and unique chassis tuning.

Features that remain available from the 2017 Ford Mustang include: the SYNC 3 infotainment system featuring Android Auto and Apple CarPlay compatibility, the SHAKER PRO premium audio system, the GT Performance Package (renamed Performance Package Level 1), the Premium Plus Package, and the Wheel and Stripe Package. New exterior color options include: Orange Fury Metallic Tri-Coat and Royal Crimson Metallic Tinted Clear Coat, while new interior color options include Showstopper Red and Midnight Blue. The refreshed Mustang was released in North America in Autumn of 2017 with the EcoBoost/EcoBoost Premium, GT/GT Premium, and Shelby GT350/GT350R models.

Safety

Euro NCAP
Euro NCAP tested a LHD (Left Hand Drive), European version of the 2-door coupe variant on a 2017 registration and earned 2 stars out of 5. The refreshed Mustang was reassessed in July 2017 after Ford made some changes to the car which included the addition of collision avoidance features. The score was upgraded to 3 stars out of 5.

IIHS
The 2022 Mustang was safety tested by the IIHS:

NHTSA
In February 2015, the Mustang earned a 5-star rating from the National Highway Traffic Safety Administration (NHTSA) for front, side, and rollover crash protection.

Marketing
As part of the Mustang's 50th anniversary celebration, Ford engineers cut a Mustang convertible into small sections and reassembled it on the 86th floor observation deck of the Empire State Building in New York City.

Ford has also implemented the In a Mustang tagline, which also features short films featuring the 2015 Ford Mustang. Such films are uploaded to YouTube on the Ford Mustang Channel.

Ford worked with Lego to create a special Lego Speed Champion version of the Mustang GT. It was unveiled at the North American International Auto Show as a promotion of the Ford Mustang. Lego and Ford gave away the models for free to children who came to show. A few months later, the model could be purchased at toy stores.

Hot Wheels have released multiple iterations of the Ford Mustang over the years, appealing to diecast collectors worldwide.

Motorsport

 
The Shelby Mustang GT350R-C, the race version of the GT350R, was campaigned by Multimatic Motorsports in the Continental Tire Sports Car Challenge during the 2015 and 2016 seasons, winning the 2016 drivers' and constructors' championships. For 2017, the new Mustang GT4 racecar was built and sold by Multimatic.

The Mustang is competing in the Australian Supercars Championship in 2020 with DJR Team Penske, Kelly Grove Racing and Tickford Racing.

The Mustang replaced the Fusion in the 2019 Monster Energy NASCAR Cup Series season. The Mustang is currently run in the NASCAR Cup Series and Xfinity Series. The Ford Mustang won its first championship in the 2022 NASCAR Cup Series from its driver Joey Logano.

Sales
In 2016, about 25% sales in the first half of the year went to rental and corporate fleet.

By region

Production
The 2015 Ford Mustang began production at the Flat Rock, Michigan plant on Monday, July 14, 2014. Flat Rock Mustang production had initially been scheduled for August 11, 2014, being moved forward by 4 weeks for undisclosed reasons. U.S. market launch of the 2015 Mustang range was scheduled on September 15, 2014, for the coupe and October 27, 2014, for the convertible.

Awards
Car and Drivers 10Best list in 2017 (Shelby GT350/GT350R model).
Car and Drivers 10Best list in 2019 (GT and Bullitt models).
Car and Drivers Greatest Of All Time (G.O.A.T.) list in 2020 (Shelby GT350/GT350R model).

References

External links

Mustang 6th
Coupés
Convertibles
Muscle cars
Cars introduced in 2014
Rear-wheel-drive vehicles
Euro NCAP roadster sports cars